Greenfield State Park is a  public recreation area in Greenfield, New Hampshire. The state park features ponds, bogs, and a forest that extends to the shore of undeveloped Otter Lake. Activities include camping, hiking, swimming, fishing, picnicking, and non-motorized boating. There is a small store, playground, boat ramp, and rentals.

References

External links
Greenfield State Park New Hampshire Department of Natural and Cultural Resources

State parks of New Hampshire
Parks in Hillsborough County, New Hampshire
Greenfield, New Hampshire